The Symphony No. 5 in F major, Op. 76, B. 54, is a classical composition by Czech composer Antonín Dvořák. It was originally published as Symphony No. 3.

The work
Dvořák composed his fifth symphony in the summer months in June and July 1875. The opus number is actually incorrect. The autograph was marked with opus number 24, but the publisher Simrock (ignoring the protests of the composer) gave this symphony a high number of 76. It is considered largely pastoral in style, similar to Symphony No. 6 which he wrote about five years later. The symphony was first performed four years after it was written, on 25 March 1879 at the Slav concert of the Academic Readers' Association in the Prague Žofín concert hall, conducted by Adolf Čech. It was published by Simrock in 1888 (also as a piano arrangement for four hands). The composition was revised in the autumn of 1887.

The symphony is dedicated to Hans von Bülow, in gratitude for the conductor's systematic championing of Dvořák's orchestral works.

Form

The work consists of four movements:

A typical performance of the work has a duration of about 40 minutes.

Instrumentation
The symphony is written for an orchestra of two flutes, two oboes, two clarinets in B-flat and A with one doubling on bass clarinet, two bassoons, four horns, two trumpets, three trombones, timpani, triangle and strings.

Notes

References
 Dvořák, Antonín: Sinfonia V. Fa Maggiore. Op. 76. Score. Prague: Editio Supraphon, 1989. H 3001

External links
 Symphony No. 5 on a comprehensive Dvorak site
 Symphony Nº. 5 Free Scores at the International Music Score Library Project.

Symphony 005
1875 compositions
Compositions in F major